Huj or HUJ may refer to:
 Huj, Gaza, Palestinian village,  depopulated by Israel in 1948
 Guz (Persian: ,), a unit of length
 Northern Guiyang Miao language, spoken in China
 Stan Stamper Municipal Airport, serving Hugo, Oklahoma, United States
 huj/chuj, Polish profanity